Football Club SKA-Khabarovsk is a Russian professional association football club based in Khabarovsk which plays in the second-tier Russian First League. They played in the Russian Premier League for the first time ever in the 2017–18 season.

History 
The club has been known under different names:

 DKA (−1953)
 ODO (1954)
 DO (1955–56)
 OSK (1957)
 SKVO (1957–59)
 SKA (1960–99)
 SKA-Energia (1999–2016)
 SKA-Khabarovsk (2016–)

The club has participated in the Soviet championships since 1957. SKA were the quarter-finalists of the Soviet Cup in 1963. They had never played in the Soviet Top League or Russian Premier League, until 2017.

SKA's best result in the Soviet First League was the 6th position in 1980, and their best result in the Russian First Division was 4th position in 2012–13. This entitled them to a promotion/relegation play-off against FC Rostov, 13th place in the RPL, but they lost 3–0 on aggregate and missed their chance to compete in the top flight.

At the end of the 2016–17 season, SKA equalled their record best finish, at the same time qualifying for a promotion play-off against FC Orenburg. On 28 May 2017, SKA were promoted to the Russian Premier League for the first time in their history, after beating FC Orenburg in the promotion play-off. They won 5–3 in a penalty shoot-out, after 0–0 draws in both the home and away legs.

SKA started their first Premier League season with 4 losses. After improving results in the next stretch of games, the losses starting mounting up again. Aleksei Poddubskiy was replaced as manager by Rinat Bilyaletdinov during the winter break, Bilyaletdinov only lasted 4 games before being replaced by Sergei Perednya. On 22 April 2018, SKA lost 0–1 to FC Dynamo Moscow at home (which was their 13th loss in a stretch of 15 winless games) and lost the mathematical chance to avoid relegation back to the second-tier Russian Football National League.

In the 2021–22 season, SKA-Khabarovsk qualified for the Premier League promotion playoffs in which they lost 1–3 on aggregate to FC Khimki and remained in the FNL.

Domestic history

Current squad 
As of 22 February 2023, according to the official First League website.

Other players under contract

Out on loan

Reserve team

Notable players 
Had international caps for their respective countries. Players whose name is listed in bold represented their countries while playing for SKA-Khabarovsk.

USSR and Russia
 Vladimir Astapovsky
 Viktor Bulatov
 Viktor Fayzulin
   Andrey Ivanov
 Boris Kopeikin
 Nikolay Olenikov
 Sergey Olshansky
 Andrei Semyonov
 Aleksandr Tarkhanov
 Akhrik Tsveiba
 Aleksandr Yerokhin
Former USSR countries
 Robert Arzumanyan
 Ruslan Koryan
 Gennadi Drozdov
 Rizvan Umarov
 Syarhey Kavalchuk

 Andrey Paryvaew
 Kakhaber Aladashvili
 Gogita Gogua
 Shota Grigalashvili
 Gocha Khojava
 Otar Martsvaladze
 Giorgi Navalovski
 Lasha Salukvadze
 Vitaliy Artemov
 Qayrat Aymanov
 Aleksandr Gorbunov
 Oleg Musin
 Serghei Alexeev
 Valeriu Andronic
 Serghei Chirilov
 Alexandr Covalenco
 Iurie Priganiuc
 Roman Radcenco
 Serghei Secu

 Adrian Sosnovschi
 Igor Vityutnev
 Wýaçeslaw Krendelew
 Denys Dedechko
 Andriy Dikan
 Oleksandr Kyryukhin
 Vladimir Radkevich

Europe
 Mark Švets
 Ventsislav Hristov
 Aivars Drupass
 Olegs Karavajevs
 Darius Miceika
 Tomas Mikuckis

Africa
 MacDonald Mukansi

Coaching staff

References

External links 
 Official club website 

 
Association football clubs established in 1946
Football clubs in Russia
Sport in Khabarovsk
Armed Forces sports society
1946 establishments in Russia
Military association football clubs in Russia